Donald Brent Key (born August 1, 1978) is an American college football coach and former player. Key is currently the head football coach at his alma mater, Georgia Tech.

Playing career
Key grew up in Trussville, Alabama, a suburb of Birmingham, Alabama. He attended and played football at Hewitt-Trussville High School. Key played guard at Georgia Tech, starting all four years.

Coaching career
While as an assistant coach at the University of Central Florida (UCF), Key was selected to be the heir apparent to George O'Leary following his retirement. Following the 2013 season in which UCF won the Fiesta Bowl, Key reportedly declined the head coaching job at UAB to remain with the Knights.

Prior to being hired at Georgia Tech, Key was the offensive line coach at the University of Alabama for three seasons. Key was hired at Alabama on February 15, 2016, replacing Mario Cristobal, who remained on staff as tight ends coach.

Before his time at Alabama, Key was the offensive coordinator, assistant head coach, offensive line coach, and recruiting coordinator for the UCF Knights. Key played under George O'Leary at Georgia Tech, where he later served as a graduate assistant before joining O'Leary at UCF. Key served as UCF's recruiting coordinator beginning in 2007, in addition to being UCF's offensive line coach. After the 2012 season, Key was promoted to assistant head coach and then to offensive coordinator following the 2013 season.

Key was named interim head coach for Georgia Tech in 2022, following the firing of  Geoff Collins. He went 4–4 as interim head coach, with his most notable wins being over #24 Pittsburgh and #13 North Carolina. Because of the team’s improvement during his tenure, the interim tag was taken off on November 29 as Key was named Georgia Tech’s 21st head football coach.

Head coaching record

References

External links
 Georgia Tech profile
 UCF profile

1978 births
Living people
American football offensive guards
Alabama Crimson Tide football coaches
Georgia Tech Yellow Jackets football coaches
Georgia Tech Yellow Jackets football players
UCF Knights football coaches
Western Carolina Catamounts football coaches
Players of American football from Birmingham, Alabama
Coaches of American football from Alabama